Alexander Babu Arulanthu is an Indian Tamil stand-up comedian, singer, yoga instructor, musician and actor.

In 2014, Alexander Babu left his corporate job as a software engineer to focus on stand-up comedy and theater shows. He has toured the United States, Dubai, Singapore, Malaysia, United Kingdom, Kuwait and Australia for his performances. In 2019 he produced his 120-minute English-Tamil stand-up-musical special, Alex in Wonderland for Amazon Prime.

Personal life 
Alexander Babu was born and brought up in a small village called Andavoorani in Ramanathapuram district, Tamil Nadu in a Catholic family. He studied engineering in College of engineering Guindy in Chennai, studied his master's degree in the United States and worked as a software engineer at Amazon in Seattle. He began his training as a Carnatic vocalist when he was in the United States.

Career 
Alexander Babu started his stand-up comedy career after leaving his corporate job as a software-engineer. During his early life in stand-up comedy he worked in the South India-focused comedy movement Evam Stand-Up Tamasha During July 2017, he began his musical stand-up act, Alex in Wonderland which combines music, storytelling and stand-up and earned him numerous accolades. He performed 115 shows of Alex in Wonderland worldwide after ending it in 2019 and it is now an Amazon Prime special He is popular in YouTube for his stand-up comedy performances; his videos have gained him millions of views and has more than 1 million subscribers as of April 2020.

Filmography

Actor

Films
All films are in Tamil.

Web series

Singer

References

External links 
  Alexander Babu on YouTube
Alexander Babu Phone Number and Full 

1975 births
Indian stand-up comedians
Indian YouTubers
Living people
Indian yoga teachers
Musicians from Tamil Nadu
Indian male musicians
Tamil playback singers
Male actors in Tamil cinema
YouTube channels launched in 2016